Levophacetoperane (Lidépran, Phacétoperane) is a psychostimulant developed by Rhône-Poulenc in the 1950s. The drug has been used as an antidepressant and anorectic. It is the reverse ester of methylphenidate.

See also 
 Dexmethylphenidate

References 

2-Benzylpiperidines
Acetate esters
Anorectics
Antidepressants
Norepinephrine–dopamine reuptake inhibitors
Phenylethanolamine ethers
Stimulants
2-Piperidinyl compounds